George Henry Magoon (March 27, 1875 – December 6, 1943) was an American professional baseball infielder who played in Major League Baseball from 1898 to 1903 with five different teams. In 522 games, he hit 2 home runs with 201 RBI. He was born in  St. Albans, Maine, and died in Rochester, New Hampshire.

External links

1875 births
1943 deaths
Baseball players from Maine
People from St. Albans, Maine
Chicago Orphans players
Brooklyn Bridegrooms players
Cincinnati Reds players
Baltimore Orioles (NL) players
Chicago White Sox players
19th-century baseball players
Major League Baseball shortstops
Major League Baseball second basemen
Baseball players from Nebraska
Minor league baseball managers
Brockton Shoemakers players
Springfield Ponies players
Springfield Maroons players
Indianapolis Hoosiers (minor league) players
Indianapolis Indians players
Toronto Maple Leafs (International League) players
Des Moines Champs players
Trenton Tigers players
Savannah Indians players
Augusta Tourists players
Bangor Maroons players